Seçishtë is a village in Han i Elezit Municipality, Kosovo. According to the Kosovo Agency of Statistics (KAS) estimate from the 2011 census, there were 2,252 people residing in Seçishtë, with Albanians constituting the majority of the population.

Notes

References 

Villages in Elez Han